Unguía is a municipality and town in the far north of the Chocó Department, Colombia.

Climate
Unguía has a tropical monsoon climate (Köppen Am) with heavy rainfall from April to December and little to moderate rainfall from January to March. It is the driest place in the extremely wet department of Chocó with only  of rain.

References

Municipalities of Chocó Department
Colombia–Panama border crossings